Mariano Sorrentino (born June 5, 1979 in Buenos Aires, Argentina) is an Argentine footballer currently playing for Persiwa Wamena in Indonesia.

Teams
  Sportivo Belgrano 2003-2004
  PSM Makassar 2005
  Santiago Wanderers 2006
  Persiwa Wamena 2007–present

References
 Profile at BDFA 

1979 births
Living people
Argentine footballers
Argentine expatriate footballers
Argentine expatriate sportspeople in Indonesia
Santiago Wanderers footballers
Expatriate footballers in Chile
Expatriate footballers in Indonesia
Persiwa Wamena players
PSM Makassar players
Association footballers not categorized by position
Footballers from Buenos Aires